The Descendant of the Snow Leopard ( translit: Ak ilbirstin tukumu; , translit: Potomok belogo barsa) is a 1984 Soviet drama film directed by Tolomush Okeyev. It was entered into the 35th Berlin International Film Festival where it won the Silver Bear for an outstanding single achievement.

The story told in the movie is based on a Kyrgyz folk tale.

Plot
Film tells the story of a hunter community living in the highlands, who had to ask for help from the people of the plain in order to survive a very harsh winter. Developing events will lead to the emergence of a love story. The belief that violating the traditional hunting restriction will result in disaster is also included in the narrative.

Cast
 Dokhdurbek Kydyraliyev as Koshoshash
 Aliman Zhankorozova as Saikal
 Doskhan Zholzhaksynov as Mundusbai
 Gulnara Alimbayeva as Aike
 Ashir Chokubayev as Kassen
 Marat Zhanteliyev as Sayak
 Dzhamal Seidakhmatova as Begaim
 Gulnara Kydyraliyeva as Sulaika
 K. Akmatova as Batma
 Ajbek Kydyraliyev as Kalygul
 Akyl Kulanbayev as Karypbai
 Svetlana Chebodayeva-Chaptykova as Sonun

Bibliography
 Descendant of the Snow Leopard (Potomok Belogo Barza), Bampfa, 24 October 1986
 The Descendant of the Snow Leopard (Potomok belogo barsa), Cinemas-Asie: "Kyrgyzstan", Access date: 09 June 2022

References

External links

 Descendant of the Snow Leopard, CIFF (Cleveland International Film Festival)

1984 films
Soviet drama films
Russian drama films
1980s Russian-language films
1984 drama films
Films directed by Tolomush Okeyev